Tommy Hughes (born 8 January 1960) is an Irish long-distance runner. He competed in the men's marathon at the 1992 Summer Olympics. In October 2019, aged 59, he ran the Frankfurt Marathon in a time of 2:27:52, a world record for his age. His son Eoin Hughes, aged 34, finished the same race in 2 hours 31 minutes 30 seconds. Their combined time of 4:59.22 was the fastest ever by a father-son duo in a marathon.  On October 24, 2020, he ran the marathon in 2:30:02 at age 60 to break the ratified age group record by over 6 minutes.

References

External links
 

1960 births
Living people
Athletes (track and field) at the 1992 Summer Olympics
Irish male long-distance runners
Irish male marathon runners
Olympic athletes of Ireland
Place of birth missing (living people)